Police Squad! is an American television crime comedy series that was broadcast on the ABC network in 1982. It was created by David Zucker, Jim Abrahams, and Jerry Zucker, starring Leslie Nielsen as Frank Drebin. A spoof of police procedurals and many other television shows and movies, the series features Zucker, Abrahams, and Zucker's usual sight gags, wordplay, and non sequiturs. It resembles the Lee Marvin police show M Squad (in particular the opening credits) and the late 1960s series Felony Squad. It was canceled after six episodes, and yielded The Naked Gun film series from 1988 to 1994.

Overview
Police Squad! was created by David Zucker, Jim Abrahams, and Jerry Zucker, who had previously worked on The Kentucky Fried Movie (1977) and Airplane! (1980). They declined to work on a sequel to Airplane! and instead chose to apply the comedic approach of that film to television.

The producers were contracted to produce an initial six episodes. The show aired as a mid-season replacement in March 1982, but was taken off the schedule after four episodes. The remaining two episodes were dumped onto the summer schedule in place of the usual summer reruns. Against critical acclaim, the show was canceled by ABC after just six episodes. The show gained a strong cult following through repeat broadcasts on cable channels. 

Alan North played Captain Ed Hocken, and Peter Lupus co-starred as Officer Norberg. In the films, those roles were played by George Kennedy and O. J. Simpson respectively, with Norberg renamed Nordberg. The only actors who reprised their roles in the films are Leslie Nielsen, Ed Williams as scientist Ted Olson, and Ronald "Tiny Ron" Taylor as the very tall Al. Joyce Brothers played herself in the fourth episode and in The Naked Gun: From the Files of Police Squad!. Robert Goulet, one of the "special guest stars" killed during the title sequence, plays the villain Quentin Hapsburg in The Naked Gun 2½: The Smell of Fear.

Episodes
Each episode's voiced title differs from that displayed on screen. In the following list, the voiced title is in parentheses.

Cast

Leslie Nielsen portrayed Sergeant Frank Drebin, detective lieutenant of Police Squad. Jerry Zucker explained that the name Drebin was picked blindly from the phone book. Zucker, Abrahams, and Zucker had met Nielsen when working on Airplane! (1980) and decided that their kind of humor matched. The team said that Nielsen would be perfect as Drebin, as the character lampooned the roles that Nielsen had played in television dramas such as The Bold Ones: The Protectors and S.W.A.T.. Ed Williams, who co-starred as lab technician Ted Olson, had been a science teacher for many years and had some previous acting experience. Zucker, Abrahams, and Zucker were amazed by his performance.

Leslie Nielsen as Detective Frank Drebin
Alan North as Captain Ed Hocken
Peter Lupus as Officer Norberg
Ed Williams as Ted Olson, Scientist
William Duell as Johnny the Snitch
Ronald "Tiny Ron" Taylor as Al

Rex Hamilton is credited in every episode as "Abraham Lincoln", with the same clip in all opening credits as his only appearance.

Nielsen, Taylor, and Williams were the only members of the main cast who reprise their characters into The Naked Gun film series. Captain Ed Hocken was portrayed by George Kennedy in the film series, and O. J. Simpson played Officer Nordberg (slightly renamed from "Norberg").

Production

Opening sequence

The show's opening sequence is a satire on traditional crime-drama opening sequences, particularly those of M Squad and various Quinn Martin shows such as The Fugitive and particularly The New Breed (which also stars Nielsen). Hank Simms, who had worked as an announcer for some of Martin's programs, announced the title of each episode, though the spoken title never matches the title caption. The sequence introduces Nielsen and North during a shootout, and Abraham Lincoln impersonator Rex Hamilton, who dramatically returns gunfire to John Wilkes Booth, as his only appearance.

Another recurring gag in the opening credits sequence is the "special guest star", a celebrity who is introduced but immediately murdered. These special guest stars are Lorne Greene, Georg Stanford Brown, Robert Goulet, William Shatner, Florence Henderson, and William Conrad. A scene with John Belushi, tied to blocks of concrete under water, was filmed but replaced with footage of Henderson following Belushi's death before the episode was broadcast. Belushi's death shocked Zucker, Abrahams, and Zucker, as they had joked about it after he had almost choked during the filming of the scene. A list of possible celebrity death shots is in the DVD release of 2006.

Writing
The show was intended to mock police dramas in the same way in which Airplane! mocks disaster movies. Zucker, Abrahams, and Zucker wrote the pilot episode, in which most straight lines were directly copied from an M Squad episode. The pilot episode is a remake of almost each scene of "More Deadly", the opening episode of the second season of M Squad. Pat Proft, who had worked with Zucker, Abrahams, and Zucker on The Kentucky Fried Movie (1977) and Airplane! (1980), wrote the third episode. Robert Wuhl was invited to join the writing staff after he had auditioned for the lead role in Airplane!. He co-wrote the show's second and sixth episodes with Tino Insana. Both episodes contain cultural references to old movies such as On the Waterfront and The French Connection. In Wuhl's audio commentary for the DVD, he mentioned that it was a nice opportunity, but that he did not really feel a connection with the show, especially because of its short run.

Music

Cancellation
ABC announced the cancellation of Police Squad! after four of its six episodes had aired in March 1982. The final two episodes were aired that summer. In an interview for the DVD release of the series, Nielsen said ABC entertainment president Tony Thomopoulos asserted Police Squad! was canceled because viewers had to pay close attention to the show in order to get much of the humor: "the viewer had to watch it in order to appreciate it". Nielsen also thought the premise was more effective in the successful Naked Gun films because the much larger screen size in a cinema increases the visual gags. In its annual "Cheers and Jeers" issue, TV Guide magazine called the explanation for the cancellation "the most stupid reason a network ever gave for ending a series".

Home media
In 1985, Paramount Home Video first released all six episodes of the show on VHS, Betamax, and LaserDisc formats as two separate volumes: Police Squad!: Help Wanted! and More! Police Squad!, each with three episodes in their production order.

Paramount and CBS DVD first released the series on DVD in 2006 in a keep case on one disc. The episodes are in airing order from ABC. The DVD extras include production notes from network executives, a "freeze-frame" that was filmed but never used, bloopers, casting tests, and an interview with Nielsen. Zucker, Abrahams, and Zucker, producer Robert K. Weiss, and writer Robert Wuhl recorded audio commentary for the first, third, and sixth episodes. Critics universally praised how the show was still funny after more than 20 years.

The series was released in Blu-ray format in the US on April 14, 2020.

Legacy

Naked Gun film series

Six years after the cancellation of Police Squad!, the first Naked Gun film was released, titled The Naked Gun: From the Files of Police Squad!. It performed well at the box office, grossing around $78,756,177. It became so popular that two sequels, The Naked Gun 2½: The Smell of Fear (1991) and Naked Gun : The Final Insult (1994), were released. The Naked Gun : The Smell of Fear was considered the most successful of the three, grossing around $86,930,411, and Naked Gun : The Final Insult grossed $51,132,598. Roger Ebert rated the first movie  out of four stars and gave three stars to each of the two following films.

Spin-offs
A series of British advertisements for Red Rock Cider were made in the same style, with the opening titles changed to other names such as "Fraud Squad" or "Fried Squid", and featuring Leslie Nielsen. The advertisements were shown in British cinemas as well as on television. They were directed by John Lloyd, with such apparent success that Zucker, Abrahams, and Zucker approached him to direct Naked Gun : The Final Insult, but he turned them down.

During the WWE's Summerslam 1994 pay-per-view event, the Police Squad! characters look for The Undertaker, who had previously vanished.

Reception

Critical response
On Rotten Tomatoes, Police Squad! has an aggregate score of 90% based on 28 positive and three negative critic reviews.  The website’s consensus reads: "Wacky, inventive, and endlessly quotable, Police Squad! is a hysterically funny leap forward for TV comedy that was tragically ahead of its time."

Upon the home video release in 1985, Washington Post critic Tom Shales commented "People can rent them and laugh, and then cry that ABC was so cruel." In 2009, the DVD set was nominated for a Satellite Award for Best DVD Release of a TV Show, though it lost to the DVD set of the eighth season of Fox's The Simpsons. In 2013, TV Guide ranked it #7 on its list of 60 shows that were "Cancelled Too Soon".

Matt Groening, creator of The Simpsons, has said, "If Police Squad! had been made twenty years later, it would have been a smash. It was before its time. In 1982 your average viewer was unable to cope with its pace, its quick-fire jokes. But these days they'd have no problems keeping up, I think we've proved that."

Awards and nominations

See also
 Sledge Hammer!, a sustained satire of Dirty Harry and other action heroes
A Touch of Cloth, a 2012 UK crime spoof miniseries
Angie Tribeca, a 2016 TV crime spoof series

References

External links

 
 The TV MegaSite's Police Squad Site
 
 

1980s American police comedy television series
1980s American satirical television series
1980s American sitcoms
1982 American television series debuts
1982 American television series endings
American Broadcasting Company original programming
American parody television series
English-language television shows
The Naked Gun
Parodies of television shows
Television series by CBS Studios
Television shows adapted into films